Kawésqar National Park, formerly Alacalufes National Reserve, is the second largest national park in Chile and one of the largest in the world with an area of 7,023,542 acres. It is located between Canal Concepción and the open Pacific Ocean, on both sides of Strait of Magellan in Chile. Its area covers parts of two out of the four provinces of Magallanes and Chilean Antártica Region: Magallanes Province and Última Esperanza Province.

Description 

The park is composed of western archipelagos; its landscape is filled with low mountain-like islands and islets and many channels and fjords. Magellanic rainforest is the dominate ecosystem of the park.

There are around 24 different species of mammal in the park, and the nearby national reserve is home to numerous marine species.

Culture 
The Kawésqar people arrived about seven thousand years ago. They were nomadic hunter-gatherers. The park is named in their honor.

Notes

References

External links

National parks of Chile
Protected areas of Magallanes Region
Protected areas established in 1969
1969 establishments in Chile
Última Esperanza Province
Magellanic subpolar forests